Vice Admiral Johan Retief  was the Chief of the South African Navy from 2000 to 2005.

Retief was born on 20 March 1946 in Cape Town, matriculating at Hoërskool Jan van Riebeeck in Cape Town.

Career
He attended the South African Military Academy after completing his Citizen Force training and graduated with a Bachelor of Military Science degree in 1967 and was judged the Best Student in that year.

He was appointed an Anti-Submarine Warfare Officer and was selected to attend the Torpedo and Anti-Submarine course at HMS Vernon in Portsmouth, United Kingdom.

He joined the Strike Craft Flotilla, initially as training officer at the inception of the project in 1975. After Completing a year as Staff Officer Surface Warfare, he was appointed Director Naval Operations in 1985. After attending the Joint Staff
Course in 1988 he served as Senior Staff Officer Research at the Intelligence Division and then as Military Secretary to the Minister of Defence General Magnus Malan and Ministers Roelf Meyer and Gene Louw.

He was promoted to rear admiral and appointed as Chief of Naval Operations with effect from 1 January 1993 until 30 April 1996, after which he served as Inspector-General of the South African National Defence Force.

He was promoted to vice admiral and appointed Chief of the South African Navy on 1 November 2000.

Awards and decorations
Adm Retief was awarded the following:

See also
 List of South African military chiefs
 South African Navy

References

South African admirals
Afrikaner people
1946 births
Living people
People from Cape Town
Chiefs of the South African Navy
Alumni of Hoërskool Jan van Riebeeck